Kenneth Trones (born 19 April 1969) is a Norwegian football defender.

He played for FK Fauske/Sprint, then for FK Bodø-Glimt, then for Fauske/Sprint again from 1991. From 1992 he played for IL Hødd. He participated in their promotion to the highest level after the 1994 season. In 1996, he went to SFK Lyn. He only got three games for the club. He later played for Bærum SK and Lørenskog IF before moving back to Fauske.

References

1969 births
Living people
Norwegian footballers
Sportspeople from Nordland
FK Bodø/Glimt players
IL Hødd players
Eliteserien players
Lyn Fotball players
Bærum SK players

Association football defenders